No Boys, No Cry is a soundtrack album by Yoshinori Sunahara for the 2009 film Boat. It was released on July 29, 2009. It peaked at number 88 on the Oricon Albums Chart.

Track listing

Charts

References

External links
 

2009 soundtrack albums
Yoshinori Sunahara albums
Ki/oon Records albums
Action film soundtracks